The following are lists of Searchlight Pictures films by decade:

Lists 

As Fox Searchlight Pictures
 List of Fox Searchlight Pictures films (1995–1999)
 List of Fox Searchlight Pictures films (2000–2009)
 List of Fox Searchlight Pictures films (2010–2019)

As Searchlight Pictures
 List of Searchlight Pictures films

External links 

20th Century Studios
20th Century Studios